The 2016 Serbia OQT basketball team represented Serbia and won the spot for the 2016 Summer Olympics at the FIBA World Olympic Qualifying Tournament in their capital, Belgrade. They were qualified for the Qualification tournament by taking the 4th place in the EuroBasket 2015. The team was coached by Aleksandar Đorđević, with assistant coaches Miroslav Nikolić, Milan Minić and Jovica Antonić.

Timeline
 May 20: 24-player preliminary roster announced
 May 30: 16-man roster announcement
 June 16: 15-man roster announcement
 June 21–28: Exhibition games
 July 3: 12-man roster announcement
 July 4–9: Olympic Qualifying Tournament

Roster 
The following is the Serbia roster in the Olympic Qualifying Tournament

The following were candidates to make the team:

Notes

Exhibition games

Tournament

Preliminary round – Group A
All times are local (UTC+2).

Puerto Rico

Angola

Knockout round

Semifinal – Czech Republic

Final – Puerto Rico

See also 
 2016 Serbia men's Olympic basketball team

References

External links
Official website
Olympic Qualifying Tournament Profile at FIBA Website

2016 1
2015–16 in Serbian basketball